In theoretical physics, the Curtright field (named after Thomas Curtright)  is a tensor quantum field of mixed symmetry, whose gauge-invariant dynamics are dual to those of the general relativistic graviton in higher (D>4) spacetime dimensions.  Or at least this holds for the linearized theory.
For the full nonlinear theory, less is known.  Several difficulties arise when interactions of mixed symmetry fields are considered, but at least in situations involving an infinite number of such fields (notably string theory) these difficulties are not insurmountable.

The Lanczos tensor has a gauge-transformation dynamics similar to that of Curtright. But Lanczos tensor exists only in 4D.

Overview
In four spacetime dimensions, the field is not dual to the graviton, if massless, but it can be used to describe massive, pure spin 2 quanta.  Similar descriptions exist for other massive higher spins, in D≥4.

The simplest example of the linearized theory is given by a rank three Lorentz tensor  whose indices carry the permutation symmetry of the Young diagram corresponding to the integer partition 3=2+1. That is to say,  and  where indices in square brackets are totally antisymmetrized.
  This has a nontrivial trace  where  is the Minkowski metric with signature 

This action is gauge invariant, assuming there is zero net contribution from any boundaries, while the field strength itself is not.  The gauge transformation in question is given by

where S and A are arbitrary symmetric and antisymmetric tensors, respectively.

An infinite family of mixed symmetry gauge fields arises, formally, in the zero tension limit of string theory, especially if D>4.  Such mixed symmetry fields can also be used to provide alternate local descriptions for massive particles, either in the context of strings with nonzero tension, or else for individual particle quanta without reference to string theory.

See also
 Kalb–Ramond field  
 p-form electrodynamics
 dual graviton
Massive gravity
Montonen-Olive duality

References

String theory
Hypothetical particles
Gauge bosons